Ratlines were systems of escape routes for German Nazis and other fascists fleeing Europe from 1945 onwards in the aftermath of World War II. These escape routes mainly led toward havens in Latin America, particularly in Argentina, though also in Paraguay, Colombia, Brazil, Uruguay, Mexico, Chile, Peru, Guatemala, Ecuador and Bolivia, as well as the United States,  Spain and Switzerland.

There were two primary routes: the first went from Germany to Spain, then Argentina; the second from Germany to Rome, then Genoa, then South America. The two routes developed independently but eventually came together. The ratlines were  supported by some controversial clergy of the Catholic Church.
From 1947 some United States Intelligence officers utilized existing ratlines to move certain Nazi strategists and scientists.

While reputable scholars unanimously consider Nazi leader Adolf Hitler to have committed suicide in Berlin on 30 April 1945 near the end of the war, various conspiracy theories claim that he survived the war and fled to Argentina.

Early Spanish ratlines
The origins of the first ratlines are connected to various developments in Vatican-Argentine relations before and during World War II. As early as 1942, Monsignor Luigi Maglione contacted Ambassador Llobet, inquiring as to the "willingness of the government of the Argentine Republic to apply its immigration law generously, in order to encourage at the opportune moment European Catholic immigrants to seek the necessary land and capital in our country". Afterwards, a German priest, Anton Weber, the head of the Rome-based Society of Saint Raphael, traveled to Portugal, continuing to Argentina, to lay the groundwork for future Catholic immigration; this was to be a route which fascist exiles would exploit. According to historian Michael Phayer, "this was the innocent origin of what would become the Vatican ratline".

Spain, not Rome, was the "first center of ratline activity that facilitated the escape of Nazi fascists," although the exodus itself was planned within the Vatican. Among the primary organizers were Charles Lescat, a French member of Action Française – an organization suppressed by Pope Pius XI and rehabilitated by Pope Pius XII – and Pierre Daye, a Belgian with contacts in the Spanish government. Lescat and Daye were the first to flee Europe with the help of Argentine cardinal Antonio Caggiano.

By 1946, there were hundreds of war criminals in Spain, and thousands of former Nazis and fascists. According to then-United States Secretary of State James F. Byrnes, Vatican cooperation in turning over these "asylum-seekers" was "negligible". Phayer claims that Pius XII "preferred to see fascist war criminals on board ships sailing to the New World rather than seeing them rotting in POW camps in zonal Germany". Unlike the Vatican emigration operation in Italy that centered on Vatican City, the ratlines of Spain, although "fostered by the Vatican," were relatively independent of the hierarchy of the Vatican Emigration Bureau.

Vatican ratlines

Early efforts: Bishop Hudal
Austrian Catholic bishop Alois Hudal, a Nazi sympathiser, was rector of the Pontificio Istituto Teutonico Santa Maria dell'Anima in Rome, a seminary for Austrian and German priests, and "Spiritual Director of the German People resident in Italy". After the end of the war in Italy, Hudal became active in ministering to German-speaking prisoners of war and internees then held in camps throughout Italy. In December 1944, the Vatican Secretariat of State received permission to appoint a representative to "visit the German-speaking civil internees in Italy", a job assigned to Hudal.

Hudal used this position to aid the escape of wanted Nazi war criminals, including Franz Stangl, commanding officer of Treblinka; Gustav Wagner, commanding officer of Sobibor; Alois Brunner, responsible for the Drancy internment camp near Paris and in charge of deportations in Slovakia to German concentration camps; Erich Priebke, who was responsible for the Ardeatine Massacre; and Adolf Eichmann—a fact about which he was later unashamedly open. Some of these wanted men were being held in internment camps: generally without identity papers, they would be enrolled in camp registers under false names. Other Nazis hid in Italy and sought Hudal out as his role in assisting escapes became known on the Nazi grapevine.

In his memoirs, Hudal said of his actions, "I thank God that He [allowed me] to visit and comfort many victims in their prisons and concentration camps and to help them escape with false identity papers." He explained that in his eyes:

The Allies' War against Germany was not a crusade, but the rivalry of economic complexes for whose victory they had been fighting. This so-called business ... used catchwords like democracy, race, religious liberty and Christianity as a bait for the masses. All these experiences were the reason why I felt duty bound after 1945 to devote my whole charitable work mainly to former National Socialists and Fascists, especially to so-called 'war criminals'.

According to Mark Aarons and John Loftus in their book Unholy Trinity, Hudal was the first Catholic priest to dedicate himself to establishing escape routes. Aarons and Loftus claim that Hudal provided the objects of his charity with money to help them escape and, more importantly, provided them with false papers, including identity documents issued by the Vatican Refugee Organisation (Pontificia Commissione di Assistenza). These Vatican papers were not full passports and thus were not enough to gain passage overseas. They were, rather, the first stop in a paper trail—they could be used to obtain a displaced person passport from the International Committee of the Red Cross (ICRC), which in turn could be used to apply for visas. In theory, the ICRC would perform background checks on passport applicants, but in practice, the word of a priest or particularly a bishop would be good enough. According to statements collected by Austrian writer Gitta Sereny from a senior official of the Rome branch of the ICRC, Hudal would also use his position as a bishop to request papers from the ICRC "made out according to his specifications". Sereny's sources also revealed an active illicit trade in stolen and forged ICRC papers in Rome at the time.

According to declassified U.S. intelligence reports, Hudal was not the only priest helping Nazi escapees at this time. In the "La Vista Report" declassified in 1984, Counter Intelligence Corps (CIC) operative Vincent La Vista told how he had easily arranged for two bogus Hungarian refugees to get false ICRC documents with the help of a letter from a Father Joseph Gallov. Gallov, who ran a Vatican-sponsored charity for Hungarian refugees, asked no questions and wrote a letter to his "personal contact in the International Red Cross, who then issued the passports".

San Girolamo ratline
According to Aarons and Loftus, Hudal's private operation was small scale compared to what came later. The major Roman ratline was operated by a small but influential network of Croatian priests, members of the Franciscan order, led by Father Krunoslav Draganović, who organised a highly sophisticated chain with headquarters at the San Girolamo degli Illirici Seminary College in Rome, but with links from Austria to the final embarcation point at the port of Genoa. The ratline initially focused on aiding members of the Croatian Ustaše including its leader (or Poglavnik), Ante Pavelić.

Priests active in the chain included: Fr. Vilim Cecelja, former Deputy Military Vicar to the Ustaše, based in Austria where many Ustashe and Nazi refugees remained in hiding; Fr. Dragutin Kamber, based at San Girolamo; Fr. Dominik Mandić, an official Vatican representative at San Girolamo and also "General Economist" or treasurer of the Franciscan order, who used this position to put the Franciscan press at the ratline's disposal; and Monsignor Karlo Petranović, based in Genoa. Vilim would make contact with those hiding in Austria and help them cross the border to Italy; Kamber, Mandić and Draganović would find them lodgings, often in the monastery itself, while they arranged documentation; finally, Draganović would phone Petranović in Genoa with the number of required berths on ships leaving for South America (see below).

The operation of the Draganović ratline was an open secret among the intelligence and diplomatic communities in Rome. As early as August 1945, Allied commanders in Rome were asking questions about the use of San Girolamo as a "haven" for Ustaše.

A year later, a US State Department report of 12 July 1946 lists nine war criminals, including Albanians and Montenegrins as well as Croats, plus others "not actually sheltered in the Collegium Illiricum [i.e., San Girolamo degli Illirici] but who otherwise enjoy Church support and protection."

In February 1947, CIC Special Agent Robert Clayton Mudd reported ten members of Pavelić's Ustaša cabinet living either in San Girolamo or in the Vatican itself. Mudd had infiltrated an agent into the monastery and confirmed that it was "honeycombed with cells of Ustashe operatives" guarded by "armed youths". Mudd reported:

It was further established that these Croats travel back and forth from the Vatican several times a week in a car with a chauffeur whose license plate bears the two initials CD, "Corpo Diplomatico". It issues forth from the Vatican and discharges its passengers inside the Monastery of San Geronimo. Subject to diplomatic immunity it is impossible to stop the car and discover who are its passengers.

Mudd's conclusion was the following:
DRAGANOVIC's sponsorship of these Croat Ustashes definitely links him up with the plan of the Vatican to shield these ex-Ustasha nationalists until such time as they are able to procure for them the proper documents to enable them to go to South America. The Vatican, undoubtedly banking on the strong anti-Communist feelings of these men, is endeavoring to infiltrate them into South America in any way possible to counteract the spread of Red doctrine. It has been reliably reported, for example that Dr. VRANCIC has already gone to South America and that Ante PAVELIC and General KREN are scheduled for an early departure to South America through Spain. All these operations are said to have been negotiated by DRAGANOVIC because of his influence in the Vatican.

The existence of Draganović's ratline has been supported by a highly respected historian of Vatican diplomacy, Fr. Robert Graham: "I've no doubt that Draganović was extremely active in syphoning off his Croatian Ustashe friends." Graham claimed that Draganović, in running his 'ratline,' was not acting on behalf of the Vatican: "Just because he's a priest doesn't mean he represents the Vatican. It was his own operation." At the same time, there were four occasions in which the Vatican did intervene on behalf of interned Ustasha prisoners. The Secretariat of State asked the UK and US governments to release Croatian POWs from British internment camps in Italy.

U.S. intelligence involvement
If at first U.S. intelligence officers had been mere observers of the Draganović ratline, this changed in the summer of 1947. A now-declassified U.S. Army intelligence report from 1950 sets out in detail the history of the people-smuggling operation in the three years to follow.

According to the report, from this point on U.S. forces themselves had begun to use Draganović's established network to evacuate its own "visitors". As the report put it, these were "visitors who had been in the custody of the 430th CIC and completely processed in accordance with current directives and requirements, and whose continued residence in Austria constituted a security threat as well as a source of possible embarrassment to the Commanding General of USFA, since the Soviet Command had become aware that their presence in U.S. Zone of Austria and in some instances had requested the return of these persons to Soviet custody".

These were suspected war criminals from areas occupied by the Red Army which the U.S. was obliged to hand over for trial to the Soviets. The U.S. reputedly was reluctant to do so, partly due to a belief that fair trials could hardly be expected in the USSR (see Operation Keelhaul), and at the same time, their desire to make use of Nazi scientists and other resources.

The deal with Draganović involved getting the visitors to Rome: "Dragonovich  handled all phases of the operation after the defectees arrived in Rome, such as the procurement of IRO Italian and South American documents, visas, stamps, arrangements for disposition, land or sea, and notification of resettlement committees in foreign lands".

United States intelligence used these methods in order to get important Nazi scientists and military strategists, to the extent they had not already been claimed by the Soviet Union, to their own centres of military science in the US. Many Nazi scientists were employed by the U.S., retrieved in Operation Paperclip.

Argentine connection

In Nuremberg at that time something was taking place that I personally considered a disgrace and an unfortunate lesson for the future of humanity. I became certain that the Argentine people also considered the Nuremberg process a disgrace, unworthy of the victors, who behaved as if they hadn't been victorious. Now we realize that they [the Allies] deserved to lose the war.
—Argentine president Juan Perón on the Nuremberg Trials of Nazi war criminals

The final period of German immigration to Argentina occurred between 1946 and 1950 when President Juan Perón ordered the creation of a ratline for prominent Nazis, collaborators and other fascists from Europe. During this period, Argentine diplomats and intelligence officers, on Perón's instructions, vigorously encouraged these groups to make their home in Argentina.

In his 2002 book, The Real Odessa, Argentine researcher Uki Goñi used new access to the country's archives to show that Argentine diplomats and intelligence officers had, on Perón's instructions, vigorously encouraged Nazi and fascist war criminals to make their home in Argentina. According to Goñi, the Argentines not only collaborated with Draganović's ratline, they set up further ratlines of their own running through Scandinavia, Switzerland and Belgium.

According to Goñi, Argentina's first move into Nazi smuggling was in January 1946, when Argentine bishop Antonio Caggiano, leader of the Argentine chapter of Catholic Action, flew with another bishop, Agustín Barrére, to Rome where Caggiano was due to be anointed Cardinal. In Rome the Argentine bishops met with French Cardinal Eugène Tisserant, where they passed on a message (recorded in Argentina's diplomatic archives) that "the Government of the Argentine Republic was willing to receive French persons, whose political attitude during the recent war would expose them, should they return to France, to harsh measures and private revenge".

Over the spring of 1946, a number of French war criminals, fascists and Vichy officials made it from Italy to Argentina in the same way: they were issued passports by the Rome ICRC office; these were then stamped with Argentine tourist visas (the need for health certificates and return tickets was waived on Caggiano's recommendation). The first documented case of a French war criminal arriving in Buenos Aires was Émile Dewoitine, who was later sentenced in absentia to 20 years of hard labour. He sailed first class on the same ship back with Cardinal Caggiano.

Shortly after this Argentinian Nazi smuggling became institutionalised, according to Goñi, when Perón's new government of February 1946 appointed anthropologist Santiago Peralta as Immigration Commissioner and former Ribbentrop agent Ludwig Freude as his intelligence chief. Goñi argues that these two then set up a "rescue team" of secret service agents and immigration "advisors", many of whom were themselves European war-criminals, with Argentine citizenship and employment.

In 2014, over 700 FBI documents were declassified (as part of the Nazi War Crimes Disclosure Act), revealing that the US government had undertaken an investigation in the late 1940s and 1950s as to reports of the possible escape of Adolf Hitler from Germany. Some leads purported that he had not committed suicide in Berlin but had fled Germany in 1945, and eventually arrived in Argentina via Spain. Within the pages of these documents are statements, naming people and places involved in Hitler's alleged journey from Germany to South America, including mention of the ratlines that were already in existence. Additional CIA documents contain reported sightings and a photograph of a man alleged to be Hitler in 1954. The claim related to the photograph made by a self-proclaimed former German SS trooper named Phillip Citroen that Hitler was still alive, and that he "left Colombia for Argentina around January 1955." The CIA report states that neither the contact who reported his conversations with Citroen, nor the CIA station, was "in a position to give an intelligent evaluation of the information". The station chief's superiors told him that "enormous efforts could be expended on this matter with remote possibilities of establishing anything concrete", and the investigation was dropped.

Finnish ratlines

From 1944, there existed a network of extreme right-wing Finns and Nazis in Finland, founded by Sturmbannführer (Major) Alarich Bross. The original plan was for the network to engage in an armed struggle against the expected Soviet occupation. When that did not materialize, the most significant form of action the organisation undertook was to smuggle out those who wanted to leave the country to Germany and Sweden for various reasons. For this purpose, a safehouse network was built in Finland and the cover company "Great fishing cooperative" was established. In Finland, safehouse routes were provided by a 50–70-man maritime transport organization. In Sweden, the target was the small town of Härnösand in western Norrland. From Finland, the ships were driven to secret loading bays around the city, where the men of the organization were ready. Some of the smuggled men were delivered to Sweden from the north over the Tornio river. Access to Europe was opened through the Swedish safehouse network.

Through the safehouse routes, the resistance movement transported Finnish nazis and fascists, officers and intelligence personnel, Estonian and East Karelian refugees and German citizens out of the country. Hundreds of people were assisted in Sweden, including more than a hundred German prisoners of war who had fled the Finns. Transport to Germany took place after the September 1944 break in German submarines, smuggling hundreds of people. At the same time Organisation ODESSA brought refugees from Germany to the Finnish coast, sometimes in several submarines at the same time. They were transported along the safe house route to Sweden and further from there.

ODESSA and the Gehlen Organization

The existence of Italian and Argentine ratlines has been only recently confirmed, mainly due to research in newly declassified archives. Until the work of Aarons and Loftus, and of Uki Goñi (2002), a common view was that ex-Nazis themselves, organised in secret networks, ran the escape routes alone. The most famous such network is ODESSA (Organisation of former SS members), founded in 1946 according to Simon Wiesenthal, which included SS-Obersturmbannführer Otto Skorzeny and Sturmbannführer Alfred Naujocks and, in Argentina, Rodolfo Freude. Alois Brunner, former commandant of Drancy internment camp near Paris, escaped to Rome, then Syria, by ODESSA. Brunner was thought to be the highest-ranking Nazi war criminal still alive as of 2007.

Persons claiming to represent ODESSA claimed responsibility for the unsuccessful July 9, 1979, car bombing in France aimed at Nazi hunters Serge and Beate Klarsfeld. According to Paul Manning, "eventually, over 10,000 former German military made it to South America along escape routes ODESSA and Deutsche Hilfsverein..."

Simon Wiesenthal, who advised Frederick Forsyth on the early 1970s novel/film script The Odessa File which brought the name to public attention, also names other Nazi escape organisations such as Spinne ("Spider") and Sechsgestirn ("Constellation of Six"). Wiesenthal describes these immediately after the war as Nazi cells based in areas of Austria where many Nazis had retreated and gone to ground. Wiesenthal claimed that the ODESSA network shepherded escapees to the Catholic ratlines in Rome (although he mentions only Hudal, not Draganović); or through a second route through France and into Francoist Spain.

ODESSA was supported by the Gehlen Organization, which employed many former Nazi party members, and was headed by Reinhard Gehlen, a former German Army intelligence officer employed post-war by the CIA. The Gehlen Organization became the nucleus of the BND German intelligence agency, directed by Reinhard Gehlen from its 1956 creation until 1968.

Ratline escapees
Some of the Nazis and war criminals who escaped using ratlines include:
 Andrija Artuković, escaped to the United States; arrested in 1984 after decades of delay and extradited to Yugoslavia, where he died in 1988 from natural causes
 Klaus Barbie, fled to Bolivia in 1951 with help from the United States, as he had been an agent of the U.S. Army Counterintelligence Corps since April 1947; captured in 1983; died in prison in France on September 23, 1991
 Otto Skorzeny, escaped an internment camp in 1948 and fled to Spain in 1950; in 1953 moved to Egypt and served as a military advisor to Gamal Abdel Nasser; travelled between Spain and Argentina serving as an advisor to Juan Perón; allegedly worked for Mossad; died in Spain in 1975.
 Alois Brunner, fled to Syria in 1954; died around 2001
 Herberts Cukurs, fled to Brazil in 1945, assassinated by Mossad in Uruguay in 1965.
 Léon Degrelle, fled to Spain in 1945; founded the neo-Nazi organization CEDADE in 1966 while under protection by the Franco regime; died in Spain in 1994.
 Adolf Eichmann, fled to Argentina in 1950; captured 1960; executed in Israel on 1 June 1962
 Aribert Heim, disappeared in 1962; most likely died in Egypt in 1992
 Aarne Kauhanen, fled to Venezuela in 1945; arrested 1947; died in mysterious circumstances in 1949
 Sándor Képíró, fled to Argentina, returned to Hungary in 1996. He stood trial for war crimes in Budapest in February 2011, before his death in September.
 Josef Mengele, fled to Argentina in 1949, then to other countries; died in Brazil in 1979
 Ante Pavelić, escaped to Argentina in 1948; died in Spain, in December 1959, of wounds sustained two years earlier in an assassination attempt
 Erich Priebke, fled to Argentina in 1949; arrested in 1994; died in 2013
 Walter Rauff, escaped to Chile; never captured; died in 1984
 Eduard Roschmann, escaped to Argentina in 1948; fled to Paraguay to avoid extradition and died there in 1977
 Hans-Ulrich Rudel, fled to Argentina in 1948; started the  "Kameradenwerk", a relief organization for Nazi criminals that helped fugitives escape
 Dinko Šakić, fled to Argentina in 1947, arrested in 1998 and extradited to Croatia. He was tried and found guilty of war crimes and crimes against humanity, serving a 20-year sentence. He died in 2008.
 Boris Smyslovsky, fled to Argentina in 1948 from Liechtenstein with the First Russian National Army. He returned to Liechtenstein in 1966, and died of natural causes in 1988.
 Franz Stangl, fled to Brazil in 1951; arrested in 1967 and extradited to West Germany; died in 1971 of heart failure
 Gustav Wagner, fled to Brazil in 1950; arrested in 1978; committed suicide in 1980

In popular culture

Novels

 Frederick Forsyth's 1972 thriller The Odessa File follows the attempts of a German reporter to track down Eduard Roschmann in Argentina.
 Playing on a similar South America theme, the 1974 conspiracy thriller novel Marathon Man centers around a Paraguay-based Auschwitz dentist's international diamond laundering scheme in New York City.
 1976 classic novel The Boys from Brazil by Ira Levin describes a plot to clone Adolf Hitler.
 In Philip Kerr's novel A Quiet Flame, detective Bernie Gunther investigates SS officers in Argentina.

Film and television

 Willy Wonka & the Chocolate Factory (1971) briefly references Martin Bormann's alleged escape to South America.
 Franklin J. Schaffner's 1978 science-fiction feature The Boys from Brazil adaptation of Levin's novel, nominated for three Academy Awards.
 River of Death (1981)
 In the season 7 episode of Seinfeld, "The Soup Nazi," the titular character flees to Argentina after Elaine publicizes the recipes to his sought-after soup. 
 In episode two of season four of The Office (2007) salesman Dwight Schrute refers to his Nazi grandfather Mannheim as "still puttering around down in Argentina," with his travel visa to visit having been protested by the Shoah Foundation.
 The 2013 Argentine historical drama The German Doctor by Lucía Puenzo portrays Josef Mengele's attempted medical experiments on an Argentinian family in the 1960s.
 The 2015 film The People vs. Fritz Bauer is a political drama about the struggle of Frankfurt Attorney General Fritz Bauer to track down Adolf Eichmann.
 The 2018 film Operation Finale is a drama about the 1960 capture of Adolf Eichmann.

See also
 Aunt Anna's, a safe house in Merano, Italy, often used by Nazi and SS members
 Die Spinne
 Nazism in the Americas
 Operation Bloodstone
 U.S. intelligence involvement with German and Japanese war criminals after World War II

References
Notes

Bibliography

 
 
 
 
 Sachslehner, Johannes (2019). Hitlers Mann im Vatikan: Bischof Alois Hudal. Ein dunkles Kapitel in der Geschichte der Kirche. Vienna-Graz: Molden, 2019. .
  Her account comes from testimony of Nazi war criminals helped by Hudal, such as Franz Stangl, Commandant of Treblinka extermination camp.
 Wiesenthal, Simon (1989). Justice not Vengeance. London: Weidenfeld & Nicolson. 

Further reading

 Birn, Ruth Bettina. Review of Goñi, Uki, Odessa: Die wahre Geschichte: Fluchthilfe für NS-Kriegsverbrecher and Schneppen, Heinz, Odessa und das Vierte Reich: Mythen der Zeitgeschichte. H-Soz-u-Kult, H-Net Reviews. October, 2007.
 Breitman, Richard; Goda, Norman J. W.; Naftali, Timothy; and Wolfe, Robert (2005). U.S. Intelligence and the Nazis. Cambridge University Press; .
 Graham, Robert and Alvarez, David. (1998). Nothing Sacred: Nazi Espionage against the Vatican, 1939-1945. London: Frank Cass.
 Loftus, John. (2010). America's Nazi Secret: An Insider's History. Waterwille: (Trine Day); .
 Simpson, Christopher (1988). Blowback: The First Full Account of America's Recruitment of Nazis and Its Disastrous Effect on The cold war, Our Domestic and Foreign Policy. New York: (Grove/Atlantic); .
 Steinacher, Gerald (2006). The Cape of Last Hope: The Flight of Nazi War Criminals through Italy to South America, in Eisterer, Klaus and Günter Bischof (eds; 2006) Transatlantic Relations: Austria and Latin America in the 19th and 20th Century (Transatlantica 1), pp. 203–24. New Brunswick: Transatlantica.
 Steinacher, Gerald (2012; P/B edition). Nazis on the Run: How Hitler's Henchmen Fled Justice. Oxford University Press; .

Aftermath of the Holocaust
Aftermath of World War II
Ustaše
Argentina in World War II
Nazis in South America
Far-right politics in Argentina
Catholicism and far-right politics